Rob Smith (born March 8, 1984) is a former American football guard and center. He was originally signed by the Cleveland Browns as an undrafted free agent in 2006. He played college football at Tennessee.

He currently teaches high school.

1984 births
Living people
People from Fort Thomas, Kentucky
Sportspeople from the Cincinnati metropolitan area
Players of American football from Kentucky
American football centers
American football offensive guards
Highlands High School (Fort Thomas, Kentucky) alumni
Tennessee Volunteers football players
Kansas City Chiefs players
Cleveland Browns players